Addington may refer to:

Places 
In Australia:
 Addington, Victoria

In Canada:
 Addington, Ontario
 Addington County, Ontario (now Lennox and Addington County, Ontario)
 Addington Highlands, Ontario
 Addington Parish, New Brunswick
 Addington (electoral district)

In England:
 Addington, Bradford
 Addington, Buckinghamshire
 Addington, Cornwall
 Addington, Kent
 Addington long barrow an archaeological site nearby
 Addington, Lancashire, near Carnforth
 Addington, London, site of the following:
 Addington Palace
 Addington Park
 Addington Village tram stop
 Addington Cricket Club
 New Addington, site of the following:
 Addington Vale park
 New Addington tram stop
 Addington Hills park, in Upper Shirley, formerly part of Addington
 Great Addington, Northamptonshire

In New Zealand:
 Addington, New Zealand

In the United States:
 Addington Mill, North Carolina
 Addington, Oklahoma
 Addington, Virginia

People 
 Addington (surname)

Other 
 Baron Addington, a title in the Peerage of the UK
 Addington F.C., a South African soccer club
 Addington Field, an airport serving Elizabethtown, Kentucky, USA
 Addington Workshops, a railway facility in Christchurch, New Zealand